Vänner och fiender (Friends and Foes) is a Swedish soap opera that aired between 1996 and 2000. It was produced by Jarowskij and first broadcast on TV3, but in 1997 Kanal 5 purchased the rights to broadcast it. The channel did so until 2000 when the show was cancelled. A total of 720 episodes were shot.

The show takes place in a fictional town called Erikshamn.

A Norwegian version named Venner og fiender was also produced, although it was no big success and only lasted 170 episodes.

Cast
Allan Svensson as Sven-Olof Sundin
Leif Ahrle as Bosse Åqvist
Anki Lidén as  Karin Sundin
Sussie Ericsson as Bitte Petersson
Louise Edlind as Marianne Åqvist (1996–2000)
Eric Donell as  Jörgen Sjölinder
Rachel Mohlin as  Kicki Lindberger
Jenny Ulving as Gabriella 'Bella' Åqvist
Henrik Norberg as Niklas Sundin (1996–2000)
Daniel Nyren as Henrik Rahm (1996–2000)
Anna Hansson as Pernilla Sundin
Miroslav Ozanic as Miro Rakovic
Martin De Marino as Dragan Rakovic
Niklas Engdahl as Toni Silvestri (1996–1999)
Anton Tyskling as Anton Rahm (1996–1999)
Sara Alström as Madeleine Åqvist (1997–1998)
Janne 'Loffe' Carlsson as Himself
Stig Engström as Leonard Alfvén (1999–2000)
Lisa Fabre as Lotta Grebke (1998–1999)
Per Holmberg as Kapten Grebke (1998–1999)
Petra Hultgren as Madeleine Åqvist (1996–1997)
Lisa Kock as Elinor Alfvén (1999)
Johanna Lazcano Osterman as Cecilia (1998–1999)
Ahnna Rasch as Jenny Eriksson (1997–1999)
Sara Sommerfeld as Susanna (1996–1997)
Mia Ternström as Stephanie (1999)
Henrik Liljegren as skater (1999)

References
http://www.aftonbladet.se/noje/0002/03/fiender.html
Jarowskij - Vänner och Fiender

External links
Vänner och fiender at the Internet Movie Database
Vänner og fiender at the Internet Movie Database
Vänner><Fiender - Online (fan site) 

1990s Swedish television series
2000s Swedish television series
Swedish television soap operas
1996 Swedish television series debuts
2000 Swedish television series endings